Opisthocomidae is a family of birds, the only named family within the order Opisthocomiformes. The only living representative is the hoatzin (Opisthocomus hoazin) which lives in the Amazon and the Orinoco delta in South America. Several fossil species have been identified, including one from Africa and one from Europe.

Phylogeny
The phylogeny below is based on the work of Hughes & Baker 1999 and Mayr & De Pietri 2014. Traditionally classified among the fowl-like birds (Galliformes), recent studies have favored Opisthocomidae's placement within the Neoaves.

Taxonomy
 Family Opisthocomidae Swainson 1837
 Genus ?†Foro Olson 1992 (mid-Eocene, USA) - cuculiform?
 Species †Foro panarium Olson 1992 
 Genus ?†Onychopteryx Cracraft 1971 (Early Eocene of Argentina) – falconid? A nomen dubium
 Species †Onychopteryx simpsoni Cracraft 1971
 Genus †Protoazin Mayr & De Pietri 2014 (late Eocene of France)
 Species †Protoazin parisiensis Mayr & De Pietri 2014
 Genus †Namibiavis Mourer-Chauviré 2003 (Middle Miocene of Namibia)
 Species †Namibiavis senutae Mourer-Chauviré 2003
 Genus †Hoazinavis Alvarenga, Mayr & Mourer-Chauviré 2011 (Late Oligocene and Early Miocene of Brazil)
 Species †Hoazinavis lacustris Alvarenga, Mayr & Mourer-Chauviré 2011
 Genus †Hoazinoides Miller 1953 (middle Miocene of Colombia)
 Species †Hoazinoides magdalenae Miller 1953
 Genus Opisthocomus Illiger 1811
 Species Opisthocomus hoazin (Müller 1776) Illiger 1811 [Phasianus hoazin Müller 1776]

Description
The only living representative is the hoatzin (Opisthocomus hoazin), which lives in the Amazon and the Orinoco delta in South America. Several fossil species have been identified, including one from Africa and one from Europe.

The hoatzin is a stunning, colourful bird from South America. The hoatzin is found in the rainforest of the Amazon.  It has a long, permanently erected crest which gives the species a stunning silhouette. This gregarious species is often found in groups of more than 40 birds, and up to 100 birds during breeding season which occurs during rainfalls. The nest is a flat platform in bush or tree above water. The chicks are semi-precocial and leave the nest at about two to three weeks of age. The adults feed them with semi-digested slimy mass from their crops, and the young are fed during the first four or five months of their life. The young nestlings can jump out into the water, and swim with wings and feet, in order to escape predators at nest. Hoatzin embryos are known to develop very quickly compared to other birds.

The hoatzin lives in tropical forested wetlands of 200 to 500 meters elevation. The hoatzin is an arboreal species and is folivorous, feeding on leaves, flowers and fruits of a small number of plant species. It has a large crop that uses bacteria to break down the leaves that it eats.  The hoatzin is unique because it has bacteria in its crop that breaks down its food while it is still in the crop. This is a process called foregut fermentation. It rarely drinks because its diet includes water. The hoatzin is sedentary and widespread in suitable habitat. They are noisy birds, calling in unison, uttering large numbers of varied sounds.

In addition to foregut fermentation, the hoatzin has a highly modified skeleton to accommodate its large crop, and in the young of this species, wing claws at the wrist joint which are used to climb among the branches of the nest tree.

References

Higher-level bird taxa restricted to the Neotropics
Monotypic bird families
Opisthocomiformes
Herbivorous vertebrates
Extant Eocene first appearances